The 1960 Preakness Stakes was the 85th running of the $175,000 Preakness Stakes thoroughbred horse race. The race took place on May 21, 1960, and was televised in the United States on the CBS television network. Bally Ache, who was jockeyed by Robert Ussery, won the race by four lengths over runner-up Victoria Park. Approximate post time was 5:48 p.m. Eastern Time. The race was run on a fast track in a final time of 1:57-3/5  The Maryland Jockey Club reported total attendance of 30,659, this is recorded as second highest on the list of American thoroughbred racing top attended events for North America in 1960.

Payout 

The 85th Preakness Stakes Payout Schedule

The full chart 

 Winning Breeder: Gaines Brothers (Marvin & Alan); (KY)
 Winning Time: 1:57 3/5
 Track Condition: Fast
 Total Attendance: 30,659

References

External links 
 

1960
1960 in horse racing
1960 in American sports
1960 in sports in Maryland
Horse races in Maryland